Volterra (Latin: Volaterrae) is a walled mountaintop town in the Tuscany region of Italy. Its history dates from before the 8th century BC and it has substantial structures from the Etruscan, Roman, and Medieval periods.

History 

Volterra, known to the ancient Etruscans as Velathri or Vlathri and to the Romans as Volaterrae, is a town and comune in the Tuscany region of Italy. The town was a Bronze Age settlement of the Proto-Villanovan culture, and an important Etruscan center (Velàthre, Velathri or Felathri in Etruscan, Volaterrae in Latin language), one of the "twelve cities" of the Etruscan League.

The site is believed to have been continuously inhabited as a city since at least the end of the 8th century BC. It became a municipium allied to Rome at the end of the 3rd century BC. The city was a bishop's residence in the 5th century, and its episcopal power was affirmed during the 12th century.
With the decline of the episcopate and the discovery of local alum deposits, Volterra became a place of interest of the Republic of Florence, whose forces conquered Volterra.  Florentine rule was not always popular, and opposition occasionally broke into rebellion.  These rebellions were put down by Florence.

When the Republic of Florence fell in 1530, Volterra came under the control of the Medici family and later followed the history of the Grand Duchy of Tuscany.

Culture 
The main events that take place during the year in Volterra are
 Volterra gusto
 Volterra arte
 Volterra teatro

Main sights 

 Roman Theatre of Volterra, 1st century BC, excavated in the 1950s
 the Roman amphitheatre was discovered in 2015 and has been excavated over the succeeding years

 Piazza dei Priori, the main square, a fine example of medieval Tuscan town squares
 Palazzo dei Priori, the town hall located on Piazza dei Priori, construction begun in 1208 and finished in 1257
 Pinacoteca e museo civico di Volterra (Art Gallery) in Palazzo Minucci-Solaini. Founded in 1905, the gallery consists mostly of works by Tuscan artists from 14th to 17th centuries. Includes a Deposition by Rosso Fiorentino.
 Etruscan Acropolis and Roman Cistern. The acropolis on the citadel dates to the 8th century B.C., while the impressive cistern is from the 1st century B.C.
 Volterra Cathedral. It was enlarged in the 13th century after an earthquake. It houses a ciborium and some angels by Mino da Fiesole, a notable wood Deposition (1228), a masterwork of Romanesque sculpture and the Sacrament Chapel, with paintings by Santi di Tito, Giovanni Balducci and Agostino Veracini. In the center of the vault are fragments of an Eternal Father by Niccolò Circignani. Also noteworthy is the Addolorata Chapel, with a terracotta group attributed to Andrea della Robbia and a fresco of Riding Magi by Benozzo Gozzoli. In the nearby chapel, dedicated to the Most Holy Name of Jesus, is a table with Christ's monogram, allegedly painted by Bernardino of Siena. The rectangular bell tower is from 1493.
 Volterra Baptistery of San Giovanni, built in the second half of the 13th century.
 Fortezza Medicea (Medicean Fortress), built in the 1470s, now a prison housing the noted restaurant, Fortezza Medicea restaurant.
 Guarnacci Etruscan Museum, with thousands of funeral urns dating back to the Hellenistic and Archaic periods. Main attractions are the bronze statuette "Ombra della sera", and the sculpted effigy, "Urna degli Sposi" of an Etruscan couple in terra cotta.
 The Etruscan Walls of Volterra, including the well-preserved Walls of Volterra (3rd-2nd centuries BC), and Porta Diana gates.
 The Medici Villa di Spedaletto, outside the city, in direction of Lajatico
 There are excavations of Etruscan tombs in the Valle Bona area.
Volterra Psychiatric Hospital, Founded in 1888 until 1978,  it was reopened for public and will be once more used for psychiatric purposes.

Transport 
Volterra has a station on the Cecina-Volterra Railway, called "Volterra Saline – Pomarance" due to its position, in the frazione of Saline di Volterra.

Notable people 
 Persius, (34-62), the Roman satirist of Etruscan stock
 Pope Linus, who, according to the Liber Pontificalis, was born in Volterra, and was the successor to Peter.
 Lucius Petronius Taurus Volusianus, consul with the Emperor Gallienus in AD 261 and Urban Prefect in AD 267-268
Meshullam da Volterra, (d. 1508), an Italian-Jewish businessman who traveled to the Land of Israel and surrounding Jewish communities. His works provide concise and important details about the nature and conditions of Ottoman Jewry.
 Daniele da Volterra, (1509-1566), Mannerist painter
 The poet Jacopo da Leona was a judge at Volterra in the 13th century.
 The Maffei family of Volterra produced the apostolic Secretary Gherardo Maffei and his three sons: the eldest Antonio Maffei, who was one of the assassins in the Pazzi Conspiracy against the Medici in 1478; second the humanist Raffaello Maffei called "Volterrano" who also served in the Curia; and youngest Mario Maffei, who was also a scholar and followed his father in the curia.
 Emilio Fiaschi (1858-1941), sculptor

In popular culture 
 Volterra features in Horatius, a poem by Lord Macaulay.
 Linda Proud's A Tabernacle for the Sun (2005), the first volume of The Botticelli Trilogy, begins with the sack of Volterra in 1472. Volterra is the ancestral home of the Maffei family and the events of 1472 lead directly to the Pazzi Conspiracy of 1478. The protagonist of the novel is Tommaso de' Maffei, half brother of one of the conspirators.
 Volterra is an important location in Stephenie Meyer's Twilight series. In the books, Volterra is home to the Volturi, a clan of rich, regal, powerful ancient vampires, who essentially act as the rulers of the world's vampire population. (However, the relevant scenes from the movie were shot in Montepulciano.)
 Volterra is the site of Stendhal's famously disastrous encounter in 1819 with his beloved Countess Mathilde Dembowska: she recognised him there, despite his disguise of new clothes and green glasses, and was furious. This is the central incident in his book .
 Volterra is mentioned repeatedly in British author Dudley Pope's Captain Nicholas Ramage historical nautical series. Gianna, the Marchesa of Volterra and the fictional ruler of the area, features in the first twelve books of the eighteen-book series. The books chart the progress and career of Ramage during the Napoleonic wars of the late eighteenth and early nineteenth century, providing readers with well-scripted articulate details of life aboard sailing vessels and conditions at sea of that time.
 Volterra is the site where the novel Chimaira by the Italian author Valerio Massimo Manfredi takes place.
 Valerio Massimo Manfredi's The Ancient Curse is also set in Volterra, where a statue called 'The Shade of Twilight' is stolen from the Volterra museum.
 Volterra is featured in Jhumpa Lahiri's 2008 collection of short stories  Unaccustomed Earth.  It is where Hema and Kaushik, the protagonists of the final short story "Going Ashore," travel before they part.
 Volterra is featured in Luchino Visconti's 1965 film Vaghe stelle dell'Orsa, released as Sandra (Of a Thousand Delights) in the United States and as Of These Thousand Pleasures in the UK.
Volterra's scenery is used for Central City in the 2017 film Fullmetal Alchemist (film) directed by Fumihiko Sori.
The 2016 video game The Town of Light is set in a fictionalized version of the notorious Volterra Psychiatric Hospital.
 "Volaterrae" is the name given by Dan and Una to their secret place in Far Wood in Rudyard Kipling's Puck of Pook's Hill.  They named it from the verse in Lord Macaulay's Lays of Ancient Rome:
From lordly Volaterrae,
Where scowls the far-famed hold
Piled by the hands of giants
For Godlike Kings of old.
 Volterra and its relationship with Medici Florence features in the 2018 second season of Medici: Masters of Florence.

Twin cities

 
Volterra is twinned with:
 Mende, France
 Wunsiedel, Germany
 Sandomierz, Poland

References 
Notes

Bibliography
Bell, Sinclair and Alexandra A. Carpino, eds. (2016) A Companion to the Etruscans. Blackwell Companions to the Ancient World. Chichester: John Wiley & Sons. 
Haynes, Sybille (2000) Etruscan civilization: A cultural history. Los Angeles: J. Paul Getty Museum.
Pallottino, Massimo (1978) The Etruscans. Bloomington: Indiana University Press.
Sprenger, Maia, and Bartoloni, Gilda (1983) The Etruscans: Their history, art and architecture. Translated by Robert E. Wolf. New York: Harry N. Abrams.
Turfa, Jean MacIntosh, ed. (2013) The Etruscan World. Routledge Worlds. Abingdon, UK: Routledge.

External links 

 
Cities and towns in Tuscany
Hilltowns in Tuscany
Villanovan culture